The 1998 Food City 500 was the sixth stock car race of the 1998 NASCAR Winston Cup Series season and the 38th iteration of the event. The race was held on Sunday, March 29, 1998, in Bristol, Tennessee at Bristol Motor Speedway, a 0.533 miles (0.858 km) permanent oval-shaped racetrack. The race took the scheduled 500 laps to complete. With the help of a fast pit crew, Hendrick Motorsports driver Jeff Gordon would manage to dominate the last 63 laps of the race to take his 31st career NASCAR Winston Cup Series victory and his second victory of the season. To fill out the podium, Hendrick Motorsports driver Terry Labonte and Robert Yates Racing driver Dale Jarrett would finish second and third, respectively.

Background 

The Bristol Motor Speedway, formerly known as Bristol International Raceway and Bristol Raceway, is a NASCAR short track venue located in Bristol, Tennessee. Constructed in 1960, it held its first NASCAR race on July 30, 1961. Despite its short length, Bristol is among the most popular tracks on the NASCAR schedule because of its distinct features, which include extraordinarily steep banking, an all concrete surface, two pit roads, and stadium-like seating. It has also been named one of the loudest NASCAR tracks.

Entry list 

 (R) denotes rookie driver.

Practice 
The only practice session was held on Friday, March 27.

Qualifying 
Qualifying was split into two rounds. The first round was held on Friday, March 27, at 2:00 PM EST. Each driver would have one lap to set a time. During the first round, the top 25 drivers in the round would be guaranteed a starting spot in the race. If a driver was not able to guarantee a spot in the first round, they had the option to scrub their time from the first round and try and run a faster lap time in a second round qualifying run, held on Saturday, March 28. As with the first round, each driver would have one lap to set a time. On January 24, 1998, NASCAR would announce that the amount of provisionals given would be increased from last season. Positions 26-36 would be decided on time, while positions 37-43 would be based on provisionals. Six spots are awarded by the use of provisionals based on owner's points. The seventh is awarded to a past champion who has not otherwise qualified for the race. If no past champion needs the provisional, the next team in the owner points will be awarded a provisional.

Four drivers would fail to qualify: Jeff Green, Joe Nemechek, Gary Bradberry, and Dave Marcis.

Full qualifying results 

*Time not available.

Race results

References 

1998 NASCAR Winston Cup Series
NASCAR races at Bristol Motor Speedway
March 1998 sports events in the United States
1998 in sports in Tennessee